Padmanabh is a mountain peak located at  above sea level in the eastern part of the Karakoram.

Location 
The peak is located in the south of Lakshmi Kangri and in the north-west of Mahashrung. It is one of the highest peaks on the Teram Shehr plateau.

References 

Mountains of the Transhimalayas
Seven-thousanders of the Transhimalayas
Mountains of Ladakh